Vladyslav Kulach (born 7 May 1993) is a Ukrainian professional footballer who plays as a striker for Zira.

Career
He was a member of the Ukraine national under-21 football team, where he was called-up first time by Serhiy Kovalets for Valeriy Lobanovskyi Memorial Tournament in 2013. In January 2023 he moved to Zira.

Honours
Individual
 Top Scorer Ukrainian Premier League: 2020–21 (15 goals)

References
Citations

Bibliography
 Vladyslav Kulach Eskişehirspor’da, sakaryagazetesi.com.tr, 12 January 2016
 KULACH RETURNED TO UKRAINE‚ manisports.ru, 24 June 2016

External links
 
 

1993 births
Living people
Footballers from Donetsk
Ukrainian footballers
Association football forwards
FC Shakhtar-3 Donetsk players
FC Mariupol players
FC Metalurh Zaporizhzhia players
FC Stal Kamianske players
Eskişehirspor footballers
Ukrainian Premier League players
Ukrainian expatriate footballers
Expatriate footballers in Turkey
Ukrainian expatriate sportspeople in Turkey
Expatriate footballers in Hungary
Ukrainian expatriate sportspeople in Hungary
Expatriate footballers in Azerbaijan
Ukrainian expatriate sportspeople in Azerbaijan
FC Zorya Luhansk players
FC Vorskla Poltava players
FC Oleksandriya players
Budapest Honvéd FC players
FC Dynamo Kyiv players
Ukrainian Premier League top scorers
Ukraine under-21 international footballers
Ukraine youth international footballers